HTR may refer to:

 Handwritten text recognition
 Happy Tiger Records catalog number, e.g. HTR-1006
 Harvard Theological Review
 Hateruma Airport, in Okinawa Prefecture, Japan
 Healing Through Remembering
 Head-twitch response
 The Herald Times Reporter, a newspaper in Manitowoc, Wisconsin, US
 High-temperature reactor, see High-temperature gas reactor
 Historical trauma response
 Horticultural therapist, see Horticultural therapy
 HTR High Tech Racing, a video game
 Human telomerase (hTR)
 Hypotensive transfusion reaction